The head of Magdalen College, University of Oxford, is the president.

The following is a list of presidents of the college:

 John Horley or Hornley (President of Magdalen Hall which preceded the college, 1448–1457)
  William Tybard (1457–1480)
 Richard Mayew (1480–1506)
  John Veysey or Harman (1507–1507)
  John Claymond (1507–1516)
  John Higdon (1516–1525)
  Lawrence Stubbs (1525–1528)
  Thomas Knollys (1528–1536)
  Owen Oglethorpe (1536–1552)
 Walter Haddon (1552–1553)
 Owen Oglethorpe (1553–1555)
 Arthur Cole (1555–1558)
  Thomas Coveney (1558–1561)
 Lawrence Humphrey (1561–1589)
 Nicholas Bond (1589–1608)
 John Harding (1608–1610)
  William Langton (1610–1626)
 Accepted Frewen (1626–1644)
 John Wilkinson (1644–1648)
 John Oliver (1648–1650)
 Thomas Goodwin (1650–1660)
  John Oliver (1660–1661)
 Thomas Pierce (1661–1672)
 Henry Clerke (1672–1687)
 John Hough (1687–1701)
  Samuel Parker (1701–1688)
 Bonaventure Gifford (1688–1688)
  John Rogers (1688–1703)
  Thomas Bayley (1703–1706)
 Joseph Harwar (1706–1722)
 Edward Butler (1722–1745)
  Thomas Jenner (1745–1768)
 George Horne (1768–1791)
 Martin Routh (1791–1854)
 Frederick Bulley (1854–1885)
 Thomas Herbert Warren (1885–1928)
 George Stuart Gordon (1928–1942)
 Henry Tizard (1942–1946)
 Thomas Boase (1947–1968)
  James Griffiths (1968–1979)
 Keith Griffin (1979–1988)
 Anthony Smith (1988–2005)
 David Clary (2005–2020)
 Dinah Rose (2020 onwards)

References

 
Magdalen Presidents
Magdalen College, Oxford